Harry Hollingsworth Forsyth (18 December 1903 – 19 July 2004) was an Irish cricketer. He was born in Dublin, Ireland. A left-handed batsman and occasional wicket-keeper, he played one first-class match for Dublin University against Northamptonshire in June 1926. He scored 43 runs in the Dublin University first innings. The match also featured the Irish playwright Samuel Beckett. From the death of Ted Martin in June 2004 to his death, aged 100, just over a month later, Forsyth was the oldest living first-class cricketer.

References

1903 births
2004 deaths
Irish cricketers
Dublin University cricketers
Irish centenarians
Cricketers from Dublin (city)
Men centenarians
Wicket-keepers